Rylance is an English surname. Notable people with the surname include:

 Georgina Rylance, English actress
 Heath Rylance, American football player
 Juliet Rylance, English actress
 Mark Rylance, English actor
 Merv Rylance, Australian rugby player
 Ronald Rylance, English rugby player

English-language surnames